Ballinkillen is a Gaelic Athletic Association club based in Ballinkillin, County Carlow. The club had fielded Gaelic football teams as far back as 1890, however, since a reorganisation in 1957 the club is now primarily concerned with hurling.

Overview

Honours

 Carlow Senior Hurling Championship (2): 1973, 2001
 Carlow Intermediate Hurling Championship (1): 1990
 Carlow Junior Hurling Championship (6): 1971, 1998, 2005, 2008, 2012, 2020
 Carlow Under-21 Hurling Championship (5): 1978, 1979, 1996, 2012, 2017
 Carlow Minor Hurling Championship (4): 1999, 2000, 2001, 2009
 Carlow Minor B Hurling Championship (2): 1989, 1991
 Carlow U15 Division 2 Hurling Championship (1): 2022

Notable players

 Pat English

References

Gaelic games clubs in County Carlow
Hurling clubs in County Carlow